Henry Liddell, 1st Baron Ravensworth (1708 – 30 January 1784) succeeded to the Baronetcy of Ravensworth Castle, and to the family estates and mining interests, at the age of fifteen, on the death of his grandfather in 1723. He was created 1st Baron Ravensworth on 29 June 1747.

He went to Peterhouse, Cambridge in 1725, and took the Grand Tour in the early 1730s.

He was Member of Parliament for Morpeth 1734–1747.

He was a founder member of the Grand Allies partnership created in 1726 by a group of wealthy land and colliery owners to cooperate in the further development of coal mining in Northumberland and County Durham. Their early investments included collieries at Gosforth, Heaton, New Benton, Tanfield, South Causey, North Biddick and Longbenton.

His seat was Ravensworth Castle, Lamesley, Co. Durham and his London address from 1735 was 13, St James's Square.

Liddell married Anne Delme (daughter of Sir Peter Delme) in 1735 and they had one daughter, Anne, who was a noted correspondent. He was succeeded in the Baronetcy by his nephew Henry. The Barony was extinct on his death, but was later recreated in 1821 for his great-nephew Thomas

Notes

References
 Northumberland Record Office: Records of North of England Institute of Mining and Mechanical Engineering

Barons in the Peerage of Great Britain
Peers of Great Britain created by George II
Liddell, Henry
1708 births
1784 deaths
Alumni of Peterhouse, Cambridge
People from County Durham (before 1974)
Barons Ravensworth